The most recent elections to Inverclyde Council were held on Thursday 4 May 2017, on the same day as the 31 other local authorities in Scotland. It was the third successive Local Council election to run under the STV Electoral System. The election used seven wards created under the Local Governance (Scotland) Act 2004, with 22 Councillors being elected, an increase of 2 from 2012 and an additional ward. Each ward elected either 3 or 4 members, using the STV electoral system.

Following the 2017 election, the Labour Party won the most seats but not enough to form majority control. At the first full meeting of the Council, Labour formed a minority administration with Conservative and Independent support with Martin Brennan elected Provost and Stephen McCabe retaining his position as Leader of the Council.

Results 

Note: "Votes" are the first preference votes. The net gain/loss and percentage changes relate to the result of the previous Scottish local elections on 3 May 2007. This may differ from other published sources showing gain/loss relative to seats held at dissolution of Scotland's councils.

Ward results

Inverclyde East
2012: 2xLab; 1xCon; 1xSNP
2017: 1xCon; 1xSNP; 1xLab 
2012-2017: Ward changed to 3 councillors. Labour lose 1 seat.

Inverclyde East Central
2012: 2xLab; 1xSNP 
2017: 1xSNP; 1xLab; 1xIndependent 
2012-2017: Independent gain 1 seat from Labour

			

= Outgoing Councillor from a different Ward.

Inverclyde Central
2017: 2xLab; 1xSNP
2012-2017: New ward

			

= Outgoing Councillor from a different Ward.

Inverclyde North
2012: 2xLab; 1xSNP; 1xLib Dem
2017: 2xLab; 1xCon; 1xSNP 
2012-2017: Conservative gain from Liberal Democrats

Inverclyde West
2012: 1xIndependent; 1xLab; 1xSNP
2017: 2xIndependent; 1xSNP
2012-2017: Independent gain from Labour

Inverclyde South West
2012: 1xLab; 1xSNP; 1xLib Dem
2017: 1xSNP; 1xLab; 1xLib Dem
2012-2017: No change

Inverclyde South
2012: 2xLab; 1xSNP
2017: 1xSNP; 1xLab; 1xIndependent
2012-2017: Independent gain from Labour

Changes between 2017 and 2022 
Innes Nelson (Ward 6) resigned from the SNP on 25 October 2017 following an assault allegation. The charges were dropped on 31 October 2018 and he re-joined the party.

Former SNP group leader Chris McEleny defected to the Alba Party on the announcement by Alex Salmond of its formation on 26 March 2021. His father Jim McEleny later defected to Alba as well.

References

2017 Scottish local elections
2017